The Sarajevo Chamber Music Festival is an international multi-day chamber music festival which annually takes place in Sarajevo, Bosnia and Herzegovina.   It was established in 2011 by the Sarajevo Music Academy in cooperation with the Sarajevo Chamber Music Institute (SCMI) and the Manhattan String Quartet.   The festival lasts for 6 days and hosts over 30 international ensembles, lecturers and composers per edition.  It is the largest chamber music festival in the Balkans.

References

External links
Official Website

Tourist attractions in Sarajevo
Contemporary classical music festivals
Festivals in Sarajevo
Music festivals in Bosnia and Herzegovina
Annual events in Bosnia and Herzegovina
2011 establishments in Bosnia and Herzegovina